The Drouin to Warragul Trail or Two Towns Trail is a cycling and walking path between Drouin and Warragul. It is primarily for use by commuters between the two towns. It is 8 kilometres long. It was funded by VicRoads.

References
https://web.archive.org/web/20090530132712/http://www.bawbawshire.vic.gov.au/Page/page.asp?Page_Id=1125&h=0

Bike paths in Victoria (Australia)